Seaside is a 2002 French drama film written and directed by Julie Lopes-Curval. It was screened in the Directors' Fortnight section at the 2002 Cannes Film Festival where it won the Caméra d'Or.

Cast 
 Bulle Ogier as Rose
 Ludmila Mikaël as Anne
 Hélène Fillières as Marie
 Jonathan Zaccaï as Paul
 Liliane Rovère as Odette
 Patrick Lizana as Albert
 Emmanuelle Lepoutre as Albertine
 Fabien Orcier as Jacquot
 Jauris Casanova as Pierre
 Audrey Bonnet as Lilas
 Jean-Michel Noirey as Robert
 Jacqueline Carpentier as Denise
 Alexandra Mercouroff as Lucille

References

External links 
 

2002 films
2002 drama films
2000s French-language films
French drama films
Films directed by Julie Lopes-Curval
Caméra d'Or winners
2002 directorial debut films
2000s French films